The 2015 Brasil Open Grand Prix was the nineteenth grand prix's badminton tournament of the 2015 BWF Grand Prix and Grand Prix Gold. The tournament was held at the Riocentro Pavilion 4 in Rio de Janeiro, Brazil on November 24–29, 2015 and had a total purse of $50,000. This tournament also serves as the test event for the 2016 Summer Olympics, thus using the Olympic tournament format.

Men's singles

Seeds
  Lin Dan
  Pablo Abian
  Misha Zilberman
  David Obernosterer

Group A

Group B

Group C

Group D

Group E

Group F

Group G

Group H

Finals

Women's singles

Seeds
  Rong Schafer
  Kristina Gavnholt
  Lohaynny Vicente
  Fabiana Silva

Group A

Group B

Group C

Group D

Finals

Men's doubles

Seeds
  Manu Attri / B. Sumeeth Reddy
  Wang Yilv / Zhang Wen

Group A

Group B

Group C

Group D

Finals

Women's doubles

Seeds
  Eefje Muskens / Selena Piek
  Johanna Goliszewski / Carla Nelte

Group A

Group B

Finals

Mixed doubles

Seeds
  Michael Fuchs / Birgit Michels
  Jacco Arends / Selena Piek
  Danny Bawa Chrisnanta / Vanessa Neo Yu Yan
  Philip Chew / Jamie Subandhi

Group A

Group B

Group C

Group D

Finals

References

External links 
Yonex Brasil Open 2015 - Draws

BWF Grand Prix Gold and Grand Prix
Brasil Open (badminton)
Brazil Open Grand Prix
Badminton